Tarantola is a surname. Notable people with the surname include:
Albert Tarantola (1949–2009), Spanish-born physicist
Anna Maria Tarantola (born 1945), Italian manager, former director of the Bank of Italy and former President of Rai
Daniel Tarantola (born 1949)
Laura Tarantola (born 1994), French rower
Vinnie Tarantola, American gasser drag racer